Virgil Vătășianu  (March 21, 1902—November 15, 1993) was a Romanian academic and art historian.

Born in Sibiu, he studied Law and Art History, becoming one of the two leading practitioners of the latter discipline in Cluj-Napoca during his time, alongside Nicolae Sabău. A specialist in medieval art, he became renowned through his numerous works, which earned him both the Herder Prize and election to the Romanian Academy, as a titular member, in 1974. He died in Cluj-Napoca.

Notes

1902 births
1993 deaths
People from Sibiu
Romanian art historians
Titular members of the Romanian Academy
20th-century Romanian historians
Herder Prize recipients